"Dirty Water" is a song by the American rock band The Standells, written by their producer Ed Cobb.
The song is a mock paean to the city of Boston, Massachusetts, and its then-famously polluted Boston Harbor and Charles River.

History 
According to Standells keyboardist Larry Tamblyn, at least some of the song (notably the references to "lovers and thieves") was inspired by a mugging of Cobb in Boston. In addition to the river, other local interest items in the song include the Boston University women's curfew—"Frustrated women ... have to be in by 12 o'clock"—and a passing mention of the Boston Strangler—"have you heard about the Strangler? (I'm the man I'm the man)."

Reception 
First issued in late 1965 on the Tower label, a subsidiary of Capitol Records, the song debuted April 30, 1966 on the Cash Box charts and peaked at #8. It reached #11 on the Billboard singles charts on June 11. It was the band's first major hit single; their earlier charting record, "The Boy Next Door", had only reached #102 on Billboard'''s Bubbling Under chart in February 1966.

Although "Dirty Water" is beloved by the city of Boston and its sports fans, the song first became a hit in the state of Florida, breaking out on WLOF in Orlando in January 1966.Dirty Water was also the title of the Standells' most successful LP, their only nationally charting album.  This LP charted on both Billboard and Cash Box magazines' charts, peaking at #52 and #39, respectively, during the summer of 1966.

The song is traditionally played by Boston sports teams following home victories. The National Hockey League's Boston Bruins  began playing the song in 1995, and Major League Baseball's Boston Red Sox followed suit after home victories beginning in the 1997 season. The surviving Standells have performed the song at Fenway Park from atop the Green Monster. The song's famous guitar riff was recorded with a Fender Telecaster through a Vox AC30 amplifier by Standells guitarist Tony Valentino. The song is also included in the soundtrack for the film Fever Pitch, which includes the Boston Red Sox leading up to the 2004 World Series.

"Dirty Water" was included in the influential compilation album Nuggets: Original Artyfacts from the First Psychedelic Era, 1965–1968, and is listed in the Rock and Roll Hall of Fame's "500 Songs that Shaped Rock and Roll".

Though the song is credited solely to Cobb, band members Dodd, Valentino, and Tamblyn have claimed substantial material-of-fact song composition copyright contributions to it as well as contributing to its arrangement.

Personnel
Dick Dodd – drums, lead vocal
Gary Lane – backing vocal, bass guitar
Larry Tamblyn – backing vocal, Vox Continental organ
Tony Valentino – backing vocal, electric guitar, harmonica

Chart history

Covers and samples

British garage rock revivalists The Inmates covered "Dirty Water" in 1979 (and replaced Boston and the Charles with London and the River Thames), a version which was a moderate hit and reached #51 on the Billboard Hot 100 singles chart in January 1980.  This song was promoted with customized promo versions recorded for many towns distributed to radio stations.  For example, the promo copy played on Jackson, Mississippi's WZZQ said "Pearl River" and "Jackson you're my home".
The song is sampled at the beginning of "These Are the Days", the first track on The Ducky Boys' 1998 album Dark Days.
Boston punk band Dropkick Murphys often include the song in live sets, such as the one documented on 2002's Live on St. Patrick's Day From Boston, MA and at the 2007 and 2018 Boston Red Sox baseball World Series victory rolling parades. A version recorded with The Mighty Mighty Bosstones' Dicky Barrett was released on Fenway Recordings' 2002 compilation In Our Lifetime, Vol. 3: The Revenge of Boston.
Icelandic indie band Singapore Sling covered it in its 2002 debut album The Curse of Singapore Sling, released in North America and Europe the following year.
Former Red Sox pitcher Bronson Arroyo's 2005 cover album, Covering the Bases'', includes a version of the song.
The Buffalo Sabres NHL team plays a cover version of this song before the beginning of the 3rd period.  This version substitutes River Charles with Niagara River, and Boston is replaced with Buffalo.
"Weird Al" Yankovic covered the song during his March 4, 2018 evening show at The Wilbur Theater in Boston, Massachusetts.
Pearl Jam covered the song during their September 4, 2018 show at Fenway Park in Boston, Massachusetts.

See also
 List of 1960s one-hit wonders in the United States

References

Songs about Boston
The Standells songs
1966 singles
Songs written by Ed Cobb
Boston Red Sox
1966 songs
Capitol Records singles